Tamera is a variation of the female given name Tamara. Notable persons with that name include:

 Tamera Alexander (born 1961), American author
 Tamera Foster (born 1997), English singer
 Tamera Mowry (born 1978), American actress
 Tamera Campbell, the character she played in Sister, Sister
 Tamera Szijarto, Hungarian-Filipina beauty queen and entrepreneur
 Tamera Young (born 1986), American basketball player

See also
 Tamera